James Doyle Penrose RHA JP (9 May 1862 – 2 January 1932) was an Irish painter known for his religious and mythological paintings.

Biography

James Doyle Penrose was a well known portrait artist, sculptor and painter of religious subjects born in County Wicklow, Ireland. He was a member of the Royal Hibernian Academy.  He came from a family of prosperous Quakers and was formally trained in London at two Royal Academy of Arts schools: St John's Wood Art School and the Royal College of Art in South Kensington.

Penrose left Ireland with his father and family about 1890 to settle in Hertfordshire near London. He exhibited his work regularly at the Royal Academy of Arts in London from the 1890s until 1927.  He travelled extensively in Canada.

He married Elizabeth Josephine Peckover, a daughter of Alexander Peckover, 1st Baron Peckover, a wealthy Quaker banker. They had four sons: Alexander Peckover Doyle Penrose, Lionel Sharples Penrose, Sir Roland Penrose, CBE, and Lt Commander Bernard "Beakus" Penrose, RNR.

They had a strict upbringing at Oxhey Grange, Watford. James Doyle Penrose owned the wider Oxhey Grange Estate. In its development of Watford Heath, he included the Rose Tea Cottage and Gardens, in an attempt to attract the local workforce away from the nearby public houses. Penrose was appointed a deputy lieutenant of Cambridgeshire on 15 October 1903.

His wife Elizabeth aged 72 died in July 1930 at Watford. He died in Bognor Regis on Saturday 2 January 1932.

Legacy 

Penrose is known primarily for his religious and mythological paintings. Other works include paintings of the Woad industry based near the Wisbech, Isle of Ely home of his inlaws, and a sculpture of his father in law.
A black and white photograph of James and his wife is in the online collection of the National Trust.

References 

1862 births
1932 deaths
19th-century Irish painters
20th-century Irish painters
Irish male painters
Deputy Lieutenants of Cambridgeshire
19th-century Irish male artists
20th-century Irish male artists